The discography of Hurricane Chris, an American rapper, consists of two studio albums, one independent album, nine mixtapes, six music videos, and ten singles (including two as a featured artist).

Albums

Studio albums

Independent albums

Mixtapes

Singles

As lead artist

As featured artist

Guest appearances

Music videos

Notes 

A  "Jigga Juice" did not enter the Hot R&B/Hip-Hop Songs chart, but peaked at number 10 on the Bubbling Under R&B/Hip-Hop Singles chart, which acts as a 25-song extension to the R&B/Hip-Hop Songs chart.

References

Hip hop discographies
Discographies of American artists